Lester B. Pearson High School is a public senior high school located in Calgary, Alberta, Canada administered by the Calgary Board of Education.  The school is named for Nobel Laureate and Canadian Prime Minister Lester B. Pearson.

The school has offered the French Immersion program since 2003 and in the following year of September 2004, Lester B. Pearson became a fully accredited International Baccalaureate World School  Lester B. Pearson High School is one of the five schools in Calgary to be offering the International Baccalaureate Programme in English, the school also offers opportunities to earn a combination of French Immersion and IB course certificates.

Location
Lester B. Pearson High School is located in the Northeast of Calgary and serves the communities of Pineridge, Rundle, Temple, Whitehorn, and Monterey Park. Junior High feeder schools to Lester B. Pearson High School are Annie Gale, Clarence Sansom, and Dr. Gordon Higgins. Pearson is also the destination high school for all French Immersion and International Baccalaureate students east of Deerfoot Trail and north of Peigan Trail. The feeder school for the French Immersion program is Bob Edwards Junior High School. International Baccalaureate students will come to Pearson from all ten junior high schools situated in Area III of Calgary.

Pearson is also connected to the Village Square Leisure Center by a skyway. The walkway is not used anymore because of safety and legal reasons between the Calgary Board of Education and The City of Calgary.
The Village Square Leisure Center includes services such as a public library, wave pool, gym, and many volunteer opportunities.

History
The school opened in 1990 with a design for the 21st century. The building has been designed to provide an ideal learning environment with a variety of teaching and learning spaces which provide for individual, small group and class work. The school is fully networked with over 350 workstations including 60 computers in the John Rollins Media Centre/Library. L.B. Pearson has a 250-seat theater, acoustic music studio, 5 computer labs, teaching kitchen/cafeteria, 2 gymnasiums, as well as 64 classrooms, science labs, and shops. The school has over 1591 students enrolled in the 2017–2018 year.

In 1990, Lester B. Pearson's architecture was recognized by the American Institute of Architects and American Association of School Administrators, Award.

Philosophy

Lester B. Pearson High School is a member of the community of Calgary Senior High Schools and shares with them the Calgary Board of Education's goal of “Educating Tomorrow’s Citizens Today.”

Programs

Lester B. Pearson High School offers a variety of programs; these include:

International Baccalaureate Programme
ACCESS (Attitude, Community, Competence, Elements of Academic Curriculum, Social Skills)
French Immersion
Adapted Learning Program (ALP)
English Language Learning
Summer School Classes
Career and Technology Studies
Dual Credit Program in Professional Foods
Fine and Performing Arts
Knowledge and Employability
Off-campus Education – Work Experience and the Registered Apprenticeship Program

Further, the school is part of the Action for Bright Children Society.

Special departments
Some courses have been constructed on a modular basis giving students flexibility in choosing topics and projects.

The building has been designed to provide a variety of teaching and learning spaces which provide for individual, small group and class work. Students in their last two years can opt to join an apprenticeship program.

Athletics
Lester B. Pearson High School competes under the governing body of the Calgary Senior High School Athletic Association (CSHSAA) and the Alberta Schools Athletic Association (ASAA). Pearson offers a wide variety of opportunities for students to get involved in the athletic program – as an athlete, trainer, minor official or manager.

Pearson competes in both Division I and II depending on the different sports. Students are encouraged to take advantage of the wide array of opportunities the athletic program has to offer.

LBP High School Girls Soccer team won their City Championships for Division 3 for the 2012–2013 season on November 1, 2012, with veteran coach Kelly Blake. This marked the first City Championship for Lester B. Pearson Girls Soccer on the 100th anniversary of the Calgary Senior High School Athletic Association (CSHSAA).

Clubs and activities

Lester B. Pearson High School offers a wide variety of clubs and activities such as:
 Animation 
 Athletic Teams 
 Chess Club 
 Connections 
 Creative Writing 
 Culinary Team 
 Debate/Speech 
 Drama Club 
 Finance Club 
 F-Word (Feminism) Club 
 FNMI Meetings 
 French for the Future 
 Graduation Committee 
 Gay Straight Alliance
 Junior Achievement 
 Math Club 
 Model UN 
 Multicultural Girls in Action 
 Muslim Youth Club 
 Nerd Club (aka Dance Club) 
 Pearson Press 
 Robotics/Electronics 
 School Store 
 Speak Out 
 SPIRIT / Leadership 
 Yearbook 
 Youth Volunteer Core

Notable alumni
Manmeet Bhullar – former Canadian politician and Member of the Legislative Assembly of Alberta
Melissa O'Neil – Winner of Canadian Idol (Season 3), a reality TV singing competition on CTV. The Rookie, actress
Robbie Sihota - former professional basketball player

References

External links

Lester B. Pearson High School Official Website

High schools in Calgary
International Baccalaureate schools in Alberta
Educational institutions established in 1990
1990 establishments in Alberta